Tory Lester Zellars (born April 24, 1996), better known by his stage name Yung Tory and nickname, Mr. Yaw Yaw, is a Canadian rapper from Toronto, Ontario. Tory initially signed to Lil Durk’s record label OTF in 2015, but after gaining recognition in 2018 he signed into a joint venture deal with Timbaland’s Mosley Music Group and Def Jam Recordings a year later. He released his debut album Rastar in early 2019.

Early life
Tory was born in Toronto, Canada, and spent most of his childhood in Atlanta or Toronto. He is of Jamaican descent and is one of the few artists to combine the rap and the rasta lifestyle. He is a lifelong vegan and is a committed Rastafarian. He was influenced in his rap style by listening to Lil Wayne, Dipset and 50 Cent. He first found his love for music as a toddler, rapping over beats on his father's Xbox console.

Career
Yung Tory has been rapping music since 2011. He was noticed by Lil Durk who signed Yung Tory in 2017.

He was signed to Def Jam Recordings in 2019 and subsequently released his debut album Rastar in March. The song of the same name was sampled by Jorja Smith on "Be Honest" featuring Burna Boy. In the same year he released the single "Friends," a song he which he used a sample from the artist Anne Marie's Marshmello, and his biggest personal single "Netflix & Chill" featuring Shoreline Mafia's Fenix Flexin.

He released his debut EP Still Here in September 2019. The album was released on Timbaland's label Mosley Music Group.

Yung Tory released the single "2020" on January 24, 2020.

Discography

Studio albums
 Rastar

Extended plays
 Still Here

Compilation albums
 6ixUpsideDown (by 6ixBuzz)

References

1996 births
Living people
21st-century Canadian rappers
Black Canadian musicians
Canadian hip hop singers
Canadian male rappers
Canadian pop singers
Canadian rhythm and blues singers
Canadian songwriters
Rappers from Toronto
Writers from Toronto
21st-century Canadian male musicians